Arts administration (alternatively arts management) is a field in the arts sector that facilitates programming within cultural organizations. Arts administrators are responsible for facilitating the day-to-day operations of the organization as well as the long term goals by and fulfilling its vision, mission and mandate. Arts management became present in the arts and culture sector in the 1960s. Organizations include professional non-profit (referred to as not-for-profit in Canada) entities. For examples theaters, museums, symphonies, jazz organizations, opera houses, ballet companies and many smaller professional and non-professional for-profit arts-related organizations (e.g. auction houses, art galleries, music companies, etc.). The duties of an arts administrator can include staff management, marketing, budget management, public relations, fundraising, program development evaluation, and board relations.

Duties and Roles of Arts Administrators 
Art administrators (alternatively arts managers) work for arts and cultural organizations such as theatres, symphonies, art galleries, museums, arts festivals, arts centers, arts councils, regional arts boards, dance companies, community arts organizations, disability arts organizations, and heritage buildings. Employers of arts administrators may be for-profit organizations, not-for-profit organizations or government agencies.

Arts Administrators take on a variety of job duties which include developing budgets, planning events and performances, negotiating contracts and developing community interest in the arts organization. An arts administrator often directs the hiring and training of personnel, devises their schedules and task assignments. Those employed by non-profit (or not-for profit in Canada) organizations are in charge of organizing fund-raising events and enlisting financial supporters. Additionally, arts administrators are expected to conduct grant research, apply for grants and disburse acquired funding so that programming can continue.

An arts administrator employed by a small organization can be responsible for marketing events, event booking, and managing project budgets. An arts administrator employed by a larger arts organization may be responsible for buildings and facilities, creative staff (e.g., performers/artists), administrative staff, public relations, marketing, writing proposals and reports.

A senior-level arts administrator may advise the board of directors or other senior managers on strategic planning and management decisions. An effective arts administrator must also be knowledgeable in local, state and federal public policy as it relates to human resources, health insurance, labor laws and volunteer risk management.

Arts administrators have the ability to create and administer necessary professional development to fine arts teachers. Professional development for the arts is often subpar due to a lack in finances from the government's allotted funding, which can be remedied by the lobbying of arts administrators.

Advocacy in Arts Administration
Like any business, arts organizations must work within changing external and internal environments. External changes may be cultural, social, demographic, economic, political, legal, or technological.  Internal changes may be related to the audience, membership, Board of Directors, personnel, facilities, growth, or financial operations. Another change that must be taken into consideration is the growing need for technology-based marketing programs (i.e.: social media) in order for the organization to change with the times and bring younger visitor and member pools into the organization.

Although a good arts administrator constantly monitors and manages change, they must also remain aware of the overall direction and mood of the organization while helping people do their day-to-day jobs.  Arts organizations, as part of the economic system, experience the effects of expansion and contractions in the local, regional, national, and world economies. Many arts organizations struggle in difficult economic times. Increasingly, the AAAE (Association of Arts Administration Educators) membership has become more interested and proactive in responding to key issues in the arts and in offering help to arts organizations on management, policy, governance, fund development, and financial issues. As a result of this new commitment, research in the program is growing in both amount and quality.

The history of Advocacy for the arts in Canada is largely represented by the Canadian Artists' Representation/Le Front des Artistes Canadiens (CARFAC). It is a non-profit corporation that serves as the national voice of Canada's professional visual artists. The organization's active involvement in advocacy, lobbying, research and public education on behalf of artists in Canada has defined CARFAC as an integral representative body for artists across Canada. In 1975 CARFAC was successful in lobbying for exhibition fees for artists. As a result the Canada Council made the payment of fees to living Canadian artists a requirement for eligibility for Program Assistance Grants to Public Art Galleries. CARFAC’s advocacy for artists resulted in the creation of the federal Copyright Act amendment in 1988. The Act recognizes artists as the primary producers of culture, and gives artists legal entitlement to exhibition and other fees. Arts Administrators throughout Canada actively refer to CARFAC's artist fee requirements when hiring professional artists.

Government Funding and Granting Bodies  
Each country has their own models and agencies to fund the arts. In Canada the arts are funded by the Canadian government through the Department of Canadian Heritage. Each province has a ministry that funds arts and culture. Depending on the governmental party in power, the amount of funds available for the arts and culture vary. In Ontario, the Ministry that funds the arts is the Ministry of Heritage, Sport, Tourism and Culture Industries. 

In Canada there are federal, provincial and municipal granting bodies that fund the arts. These granting bodies are arms-length funding agencies, meaning they work separately from the government. Canada Council for the Arts, a federal granting body, was created in 1957 and it fulfilled the requirements of the Massey Commission. Canada Council for the Arts funds artists, collectives and arts organizations from all provinces and territories in Canada. CCA funds circus arts, dance, deaf and disability arts, digital arts, indigenous arts, inter-arts, literature, media arts, multidisciplinary activities, music and sound, theatre, visual arts and other discipline arts. In 2018-19, CCA granted $246.1M to the arts in Canada. In Ontario, the Ontario Arts Council provides grants to Ontario-based individual artists and arts professionals, ad hoc groups/collectives and organizations. The OAC provides two types of grants which are project grants (one-time grants for specific projects, available to individual artists, ad hoc groups/collectives and organizations) and operating grants (ongoing support for Ontario-based, not-for-profit arts organizations and for-profit book and magazine publishers).

The United States arts system has a variety of government subsidies composing roughly 7 percent of the nation’s total investment in not-for-profit arts groups. The National Endowment for the Arts is an independent federal agency that was created in 1965 in the United States of America. The NEA’s role is to make sure all Americans have access to the arts no matter where they live. The NEA’s funding is project-based and goes to thousands of nonprofits each year, along with partnerships and special arts initiatives, research and other support that contribute to the vitality of neighborhoods, students and schools, workplace and culture.

The United States also has State/Regional Arts Agencies. The State/Regional Arts Agencies are funded through the NEA since they are required to apportion funds to any state that has an art agency. Local Arts Agencies function as councils or commissions, or as city departments, and are funded by various sources: the NEA; state arts agencies, municipal budgets, and private donations.

The arts in the United Kingdom is funded through the Department for Digital, Culture, Media and Sport which is a department of the United Kingdom government. The DCMS is supported by 45 agencies and public bodies. In England, the Arts Council England is a non-departmental public body of the Department for Digital, Culture, Media and Sport.

In the United Kingdom there is a charity called Art Fund. For over 110 years they have supported museums and galleries, and have helped them buy and display great works of art for everyone to enjoy. Art Fund has funding for acquisitions, training and development, and tours and exhibitions. Art Fund also advocates and campaigns for important causes like the free entry to national museums in the UK, and more recently for tax incentives to encourage philanthropy.

Planned Giving 
Planned giving also known as legacy giving is a form of philanthropy that is a common practice in the arts sector. Planned giving is when a donor leaves an endowment, assets or a portion of their last will and testament to an organization at the end of their lifetime. Strategic charitable gift planning is a donor-centred process of planning current and future charitable gifts in a way that meets the donor’s philanthropic goals and balances personal, family and tax considerations. Legacy giving is considered the highest charitable gift an organization can receive and often takes many years to establish this kind of relationship with a donor.

Academic programs
Arts administration programs are available at a number of universities and colleges in the US, the UK, Canada and Australia.   In the United States, these programs began in the 1970s at several schools after meetings with the National Endowment for the Arts on how the next generations of arts leaders would be educated.  Some academic units offer certificate programs for practitioners seeking continuing education or professional development education. While programs in arts administration draw on many elements of related administration fields, such as business administration, they also include specialized courses on administering non-profit arts and cultural organizations.

Arts administration programs award a range of credentials, including certificates and diplomas, bachelor's degrees, and master's degrees. These programs usually blend curriculum elements from existing administration programs such as public administration, business administration, arts law, and management. At some institutions arts administration may be a concentration within the school's Master of Business Administration (MBA) program. The MA in Arts Administration program at Columbia University is the only program that ties together curriculum elements from public and private management/administration, law, business, and finance at an Ivy league university.  Many arts administration programs include a practicum in which the student volunteers or works in an arts or cultural organization to gain practical experience.

At some universities, similar programs are called arts management (e.g. American University), performing arts management (e.g. DePaul University's Undergraduate music program), or arts leadership (e.g. DePaul University's Graduate program, University of Southern California's Master of Science in Arts Leadership program).  

Universities such as American, Wisconsin and Indiana, among many others, offer programs to students in all arts disciplines, while others are more specialized towards a particular discipline (DePaul's undergraduate and graduate theatre programs are theatre oriented, while its undergraduate music program is music oriented).  The master's degree at some schools is an MBA, while other universities offer MFA, MA, and MPA degrees, largely depending on where the program is housed.  For example, at American University, the program is part of the Department of Performing Arts, whereas at Indiana University it is part of the School of Public and Environmental Affairs.  Another program differentiator of note is that the MFA is considered a terminal degree in the field, allowing graduates to apply to teach at the university level as a full-time professor.

Though curricula may be similar, the atmosphere of programs may differ.  Variances between programs may often revolve around the centrality of arts versus the centrality of business skills in the curriculum. Some programs provide a balance of management skills in business and arts like the online graduate certificate of arts leadership and cultural management at the University of Connecticut. Other programs, such as Ohio State, Indiana, and (increasingly) American, are strongly rooted in cultural policy.  Another program differentiator is the amount of time spent "in the field," applying academic principles to existing arts organizations through practicum or internship experiences.  Seattle University's MFA in Arts Leadership degree program requires that students spend time each quarter working with a local arts organization through a practicum.  They believe this emphasis on real-world interaction helps reinforce classwork and helps build a network of arts professionals that serves as a resource upon graduation. At George Mason University, MA in Arts Management at the College of Visual & Performing Arts (Arlington, VA) , one of the largest enrolled programs in the USA, no less than 252 hours of internship are required in at least two different arts organizations. At this institution, the faculty are required to be both academically and experientially qualified, with many being current senior arts managers at some of the Washington, DC's area most prominent visual & performing arts centers.

Most programs require two years in residence, though Drexel University, University of Denver, and Goucher College offer online options with limited residency. The University of Kentucky, and Kutztown University of Pennsylvania offer fully online degrees in arts administration.  In order to accommodate full-time employment, provide strong networking opportunities, and many teamwork opportunities, programs such as Seattle University have adopted a cohort model and offer classes on evenings and weekends.

Some programs offer dual degrees.  For example, the University of Cincinnati offers an MA/MBA program in conjunction with the Cincinnati College-Conservatory of Music.  The UC/CCM Graduate Arts Administration Program, like most others, exists to prepare and train students to become successful CEOs and senior managers of non-profit arts and cultural institutions by combining business administration and real-world experience.

In Italy, the Istituto Europeo di Design, in Venice, offers a Master in Business Administration in Arts and Cultural Events that provides advanced knowledge and entrepreneurial skills necessary to understand and operate in the multifarious world of the arts. Università Cattolica del Sacro Cuore in Milan, offers 1-year Specializing Master program in Arts Management. A similar course is held in Bologna, at the University of Bologna, called Innovation and Organization of Culture and the Arts , offering a double degree opportunity together with Carnegie Mellon's Master of Arts Management. In Turin, the St. John International University  offers a Master of Arts in International Arts Administration. A new innovative program based on the concept of artwork as 'information', that integrate recording, cataloging, communication, management, fruition. The program is led by faculty and high level practitioners from Heritage, srl.

Other programs may offer a single degree that includes coursework at two colleges. Carnegie Mellon's Master of Arts Management (MAM) Program is one example, tying the College of Fine Arts to Heinz College's School of Public Policy and Management. Heinz College provides the core management coursework and the College of Fine Arts supports the MAM Program with coursework specific to arts institutions.  Another example is the two-year MA/MBA program at Southern Methodist University, offering a Master of Arts in Arts Administration from the Meadows School of the Arts and a Master of Business Administration from the Cox School of Business.

Some programs are housed within their university's Music, Theater and Dance department like the one at Colorado State University in Fort Collins, Colorado. This is the LEAP Institute for the Arts Master of Arts Leadership and Administration residential and online programs. Another example is the University of Southern California's Master of Science in Arts Leadership which is housed within the USC Thornton School of Music, and accepts thought leaders in any artistic discipline including music, theatre, dance, film, and fine art.

Several universities offer concentrations in media (film, television, music, new media, etc.) management: Drexel University, Carnegie Mellon, and Columbia College Chicago are examples.  Carnegie Mellon offers a separate degree in film/television management. New York University's MA in Arts Administration program allows students to choose a visual arts or a performing arts focus.

References

External links
Arts Management Network International information service for arts administration.
Association of Arts Administration Educators An international association of degree-granting programs in arts and cultural management.
European Network of Cultural Administration Training Centres

Academic disciplines
 
Arts occupations
Management occupations
Occupations in music